Diospyros is a genus of over 700 species of deciduous and evergreen trees and shrubs. The majority are native to the tropics, with only a few species extending into temperate regions. Individual species valued for their hard, heavy, dark timber, are commonly known as ebony trees, while others are valued for their fruit and known as persimmon trees.  Some are useful as ornamentals and many are of local ecological importance. Species of this genus are generally dioecious, with separate male and female plants.

Taxonomy and etymology
The generic name Diospyros comes from a Latin name for the Caucasian persimmon (D. lotus), derived from the Greek διόσπυρος : dióspyros, from diós and pyrós. The Greek name literally means "Zeus's wheat" but more generally intends "divine food" or "divine fruit".

The genus is a large one and the number of species has been estimated variously, depending on the date of the source. The Royal Botanic Gardens, Kew, list has over 1000 entries, including synonyms and items of low confidence. Over 700 species are marked as being assigned with high confidence.

The oldest fossils of the genus date to the Eocene, which indicate by that time Diospyros was widely distributed over the Northern Hemisphere.

Chemotaxonomy

The leaves of Diospyros blancoi have been shown to contain isoarborinol methyl ether (also called cylindrin) and fatty esters of α- and β-amyrin. Both isoarborinol methyl ether and the amyrin mixture demonstrated antimicrobial activity against Escherichia coli, Pseudomonas aeruginosa, Candida albicans, Staphylococcus aureus, and Trichophyton interdigitale. Anti-inflammatory and analgesic properties have also been shown for the isolated amyrin mixture.

Ecology
Diospyros species are important and conspicuous trees in many of their native ecosystems, such as lowland dry forests of the former Maui Nui in Hawaii, Caspian Hyrcanian mixed forests, Khathiar–Gir dry deciduous forests, Louisiade Archipelago rain forests, Madagascar lowland forests, Narmada Valley dry deciduous forests, New Caledonian sclerophytic vegetation, New Guinea mangroves or South Western Ghats montane rain forests. The green fruits are rich in tannins and thus avoided by most herbivores; when ripe they are eagerly eaten by many animals however, such as the rare Aders' duiker (Cephalophus adersi).

The foliage is used as food by the larvae of numerous Lepidoptera species:

Arctiidae:
 Eupseudosoma aberrans
 Eupseudosoma involutum (snowy eupseudosoma)
 Hypercompe indecisa
Geometridae:
 Gymnoscelis rufifasciata (double-striped pug) – recorded on persimmons
Limacodidae:
 Monema flavescens
Lycaenidae:
 Neopithecops zalmora (Quaker)
Nymphalidae:
 Charaxes khasianus (Kihansi charaxes) – recorded on D. natalensis
 Dophla evelina (redspot duke) – recorded on D. candolleana
Saturniidae:
 Actias luna (Luna moth) – recorded on persimmons
 Callosamia promethea (promethea silkmoth) – recorded on persimmons
 Citheronia regalis (regal moth) – recorded on American persimmon (D. virginiana)
Tortricidae:
 "Cnephasia" jactatana (black-lyre leafroller moth)

An economically significant plant pathogen infecting many Diospyros species – D. hispida, kaki persimmon (D. kaki), date-plum (D. lotus), Texas persimmon (D. texana), Coromandel ebony (D. melanoxylon) and probably others – is the sac fungus Pseudocercospora kaki, which causes a leaf spot disease.

Use by humans

The genus includes several plants of commercial importance, either for their edible fruit (persimmons) or for their timber (ebony). The latter are divided into two groups in trade: the pure black ebony (notably from D. ebenum, but also several other species), and the striped ebony or calamander wood (from D. celebica, D. mun and others). Most species in the genus produce little to none of this black ebony-type wood; their hard timber (e.g. of American persimmon, D. virginiana) may still be used on a more limited basis.

Leaves of the Coromandel ebony (D. melanoxylon) are used to roll South Asian beedi cigarettes. Several species are used in herbalism, and D. leucomelas yields the versatile medical compound betulinic acid. Extracts from Diospyros plants have also been proposed as novel anti-viral treatment. Though bees do not play a key role as pollinators, in plantations Diospyros may be of some use as honey plants. D. mollis, locally known as mặc nưa, is used in Vietnam to dye the famous black lãnh Mỹ A silk of Tân Châu district.

The reverence of these trees in their native range is reflected by their use as floral emblems. In Indonesia, D. celebica (Makassar ebony, known locally as eboni) is the provincial tree of Central Sulawesi, while ajan kelicung (D. macrophylla) is that of West Nusa Tenggara. The emblem of the Japanese island of Ishigaki is the Yaeyama kokutan (D. ferrea). The Gold apple (D. decandra), called "Trái thị" in Vietnamese, is a tree in the Tấm Cám fable. It is also the provincial tree of Chanthaburi as well as Nakhon Pathom Provinces in Thailand, while the black-and-white ebony (D. malabarica) is that of Ang Thong Province. The name of the Thai district Amphoe Tha Tako, literally means "District of the Diospyros pier", the latter being a popular local gathering spot.

Selected species

 Diospyros abyssinica 
 Diospyros acuminata 
 Diospyros alatella 
 Diospyros andamanica 
 Diospyros apiculata 
 Diospyros areolata 
 Diospyros artanthifolia 
 Diospyros atrata 
 Diospyros attenuata 
 Diospyros australis  – yellow persimmon, black plum, "grey plum"
 Diospyros beccarioides 
 Diospyros borneensis 
 Diospyros britannoborneensis 
 Diospyros buxifolia 
 Diospyros cambodiana 
 Diospyros candolleana 
 Diospyros celebica  – Makassar ebony
 Diospyros chaetocarpa 
 Diospyros chamaethamnus  – sand apple
 Diospyros chloroxylon 
 Diospyros clementium 
 Diospyros confertiflora  
 Diospyros cordata 
 Diospyros coriacea 
 Diospyros crassiflora  – Gaboon ebony, Gabon ebony, African ebony, West African ebony, Benin ebony
 Diospyros crockerensis 
 Diospyros curranii 
 Diospyros daemona 
 Diospyros decandra  – gold apple
 Diospyros dichrophylla 
 Diospyros dictyoneura 
 Diospyros diepenhorstii 
 Diospyros discocalyx 
 Diospyros discolor  – kamagong, mabolo, butter fruit, velvet-apple
 Diospyros duclouxii
 Diospyros ebenum  – Ceylon ebony, India ebony, "ebony"
 Diospyros elliptifolia 
 Diospyros eriantha 
 Diospyros eucalyptifolia 
 Diospyros euphlehia 
 Diospyros evena 
 Diospyros everettii 
 Diospyros fasciculosa  
 Diospyros ferox 
 Diospyros ferrea  
 Diospyros ferruginescens 
 Diospyros foxworthyi 
 Diospyros frutescens 
 Diospyros fusiformis 
 Diospyros geminata  
 Diospyros hallieri 
 Diospyros havilandii 
 Diospyros hebecarpa 
 Diospyros hillebrandii 
 Diospyros hirsuta 
 Diospyros humilis  – Queensland ebony 
 Diospyros inconstans 
 Diospyros insignis 
 Diospyros insularis  – Papua ebony 
 Diospyros kaki  – Japanese persimmon, kaki persimmon, Asian persimmon
 Diospyros keningauensis 
 Diospyros korthalsiana 
 Diospyros kurzii  – Andaman marblewood
 Diospyros lanceifolia  
 Diospyros lateralis 
 Diospyros leucomelas 
 Diospyros longibracteata 
 Diospyros lotus  – date-plum, Caucasian persimmon, lilac persimmon
 Diospyros lunduensis 
 Diospyros lycioides  – bushveld bluebush
 subsp. guerkei 
 subsp. nitens 
 subsp. sericea 
 Diospyros mabacea  – red-fruited ebony
 Diospyros macrophylla 
 Diospyros maingayi 
 Diospyros major 
 Diospyros malabarica  – black-and-white ebony, pale moon ebony, Malabar ebony, gaub tree
 Diospyros maritima 
 Diospyros marmorata  – marblewood ebony, "marblewood"
 Diospyros melanoxylon  – Coromandel ebony, East Indian ebony
 var. tupru 
 Diospyros mespiliformis  – jackalberry, "African ebony"
 Diospyros mindanaensis 
 Diospyros montana 
 Diospyros mun  – mun ebony
 Diospyros muricata 
 Diospyros neurosepala 
 Diospyros nigra  – black sapote, chocolate pudding fruit, "black persimmon"
 Diospyros oligantha 
 Diospyros oocarpa 
 Diospyros oppositifolia 
 Diospyros ovalifolia 
 Diospyros parabuxifolia 
 Diospyros pendula 
 Diospyros penibukanensis 
 Diospyros pentamera  – myrtle ebony, grey persimmon, black myrtle, grey plum
 Diospyros perfida 
 Diospyros pilosanthera 
 Diospyros piscicapa 
 Diospyros plectosepala 
 Diospyros puncticulosa 
 Diospyros pyrrhocarpa 
 Diospyros quaesita 
 Diospyros racemosa 
 Diospyros revaughanii 
 Diospyros rhombifolia 
 Diospyros ridleyi 
 Diospyros rigida 
 Diospyros rufa 
 Diospyros sandwicensis 
 Diospyros seychellarum  
 Diospyros siamang 
 Diospyros simaloerensis 
 Diospyros singaporensis 
 Diospyros squamifolia 
 Diospyros squarrosa  – rigid star-berry
 Diospyros styraciformis 
 Diospyros subrhomboidea 
 Diospyros subtruncata 
 Diospyros sulcata 
 Diospyros sumatrana 
 Diospyros tessellaria  – Mauritius ebony
 Diospyros texana  – Texas persimmon, Mexican persimmon, "black persimmon"
 Diospyros thwaitesii 
 Diospyros tuberculata 
 Diospyros ulo 
 Diospyros venosa 
 var. olivacea 
 Diospyros virginiana  – American persimmon, eastern persimmon, common persimmon, possumwood, "simmon", "sugar-plum"
 Diospyros walkeri 
 Diospyros wallichii 
 Diospyros whyteana  – Cape ebony

See also
 Adriaan van Royen
 Ebonol
 Tonewood

References

External links

 
Ericales genera
Fruit trees
Dioecious plants